High School Musical: The Musical: The Series: The Soundtrack: Season 3 is the soundtrack album for the third season of the streaming television series High School Musical: The Musical: The Series, which was released one day after the third-season finale on September 15, 2022, by Walt Disney Records. The soundtrack for the season contains original songs, as well as songs from the films High School Musical 2, Camp Rock and Camp Rock 2: The Final Jam, and the stage adaptation of the 2013 film Frozen.

Background
In September 2021, High School Musical: The Musical: The Series was renewed for a third season, despite fan speculation that it would not. Despite speculation that it would center around the Disney Channel Original Movie Camp Rock, in November of that year, it was confirmed that the musical would be the stage adaptation of the 2013 film Frozen.

Composition
The soundtrack features new recordings of songs from the film High School Musical 2; "What Time Is It?," a full recording of "Fabulous" (a portion of this song was used in a medley of songs from High School Musical 2 in the second season) and "Everyday". Also featured are songs from the Camp Rock film series; "Start the Party," "It's On," "Wouldn't Change a Thing," and "This Is Me." Finally, songs from the stage adaptation of Frozen are included: "For the First Time in Forever," "Do You Want to Build a Snowman?," "Love Is an Open Door," "A Little Bit of You," "What Do You Know About Love?," "In Summer," "Let It Go," and "Kristoff Lullaby," all by husband-wife duo Robert Lopez and Kristen Anderson-Lopez.

Recurring guest star Corbin Bleu contributes to two numbers: a duet with star Sofia Wylie on the original song "Different Way to Dance," and with the entire cast on "Everyday." On collaborating with Wylie on "Different Way to Dance," Bleu noted Wylie's talent and pushed to work with her, adding he was "moved to see another person of color" at the center of the franchise. In response, Wylie stated that working with Blue was "truly a pinch-me moment...I just loved him and I loved his talent and who he was as a person." Series regulars Kate Reinders and Larry Saperstein, who recurred and guest starred in the third season respectively, also contribute to "Everyday." Recurring star Meg Donnelly contributes to the song "It's On."

Star Joshua Bassett once again contributed to an original song; along with Doug Rockwell and Tova Litvin, he co-wrote the song "Finally Free." On writing "Finally Free", Bassett recalled that "...as soon as [showrunner Tim Federle] got in the Zoom call, I heard melody and immediate lyrics and immediately I was like, well, that's gotta be it." Star Dara Reneé also co-wrote a song, "Here I Come," with writers Steph Jones and Anthony M. Jones. Reneé has stated that "Here I Come" was written in response to her anxiety. Former star Olivia Rodrigo exited the series after the third season following a guest role, and gave her final musical performance to the series, an original song titled "You Never Know."

Singles
Prior to the first episode's premiere, the group song "It's On" was released on July 8, 2022.

In the lead-up to the album's release, each song was released as a single to correlate with the episodes being distributed and all music videos were released individually on the DisneyMusicVEVO YouTube channel as well as the individual artists' channels. "What Time Is It/Start the Party Mashup," "Finally Free," and "Shallow Lake" were released on the same date as the third season's debut on July 27, 2022. On August 3, "Balance," "For the First Time in Forever/Do You Want to Build a Snowman? Mashup," "For the First Time in Forever," and "You Never Know" were released. "Ballad of Susan Fine" and "Rising" were released on August 10. "Fabulous" and "Love Is An Open Door" were released on August 17. "A Little Bit of You," "What Do You Know About Love?," and "Right Place" were released on August 24.

"It's On" appeared in the sixth episode, and was released again alongside "Different Way to Dance" on August 31. On September 7, "Wouldn't Change a Thing" and "Here I Come" were released. The remaining songs used in the season: "This Is Me," "In Summer," "Let It Go," "Kristoff Lullaby," and "Everyday," along with a remix of "Right Place" featuring Joshua Bassett, were released in tandem with the full soundtrack's release on September 15.

Release and promotion
The soundtrack was released digitally on all music streaming services on September 15, 2022, and physically at Target the following day.

Reception
Diego Paralta of Cultured Vultures said of the music, "the show doesn't disappoint. The singing and dancing isn't designed to look spectacular, but...the groove of the soundtrack knows what you like by now." However, in a more mixed review of the music, The Oakland Post's D'Juanna Lester criticized the need to turn classic Disney songs into pop songs, adding: "They turned so many of their songs into auto tuned tracks that took me out of the story. This cast is super talented — there was no need to add all these extra things to the songs. Just let them sing...[though "Here I Come"] broke me."

Track listing
Credits adapted from Tidal.

References 

High School Musical albums
2022 soundtrack albums
Walt Disney Records soundtracks
Cast recordings
Television soundtracks
High School Musical: The Musical: The Series